Sambar  (romanized: Sāmbār) is a lentil-based vegetable stew, cooked with pigeon pea and tamarind broth. It is popular in South Indian, Sri Lankan and Maldivian cuisines. The stew has been adapted into Burmese cuisine as a popular accompaniment to Burmese curries.

History 

The story about the origin of sambar states that the original recipe for sambar can actually be traced to Maratha ruler Chhatrapati Shivaji's son Sambhaji. Legend has it that Shivaji's son Chhatrapati Sambhaji Raje Bhonsale, who was one of the Maratha rulers, attempted to make dal for himself when his head chef was away.
He loved his own concoction which was then referred to as 'Sambar'.

Comparably, according to food historian K. T. Achaya, the earliest extant mention of sambar in literature can be dated to the 17th century in Tamilakam. 

The word sambar stems from the Tamil word champāram.

A Tamil inscription of 1530 CE, shows the use of the word champāram in the sense of meaning a dish of rice accompanying other rice dishes or spice ingredients with which a dish of vegetable rice is cooked:

Regional variations 
Sambar is variously called thizone chinyay hin (သီးစုံချဉ်ရည်ဟင်း), thizone pe kala hin (သီးစုံပဲကလားဟင်း), or derivatives like thizone hin or pe kala hin in the Burmese language. The Burmese version incorporates dried salted fish and a variety of vegetables including eggplants, okra, moringa, gourd, green beans, and potatoes in a soup base of pureed chickpeas, which is seasoned with ripe tamarind, curry leaf, pyindawthein leaf, masala, cumin, chilies, onions and garlic.

See also

Cuisine of Andhra Pradesh
Cuisine of Tamil Nadu
Cuisine of Maharashtra
Cuisine of Karnataka
Kerala cuisine
 List of soups
 List of stews
Udupi cuisine
South Indian cuisine

References

Tamil cuisine
Kerala cuisine
Karnataka cuisine
Andhra cuisine
Lentil dishes
South Indian cuisine
Vegetarian dishes of India
Burmese cuisine
Sri Lankan cuisine
Maldivian cuisine